"Hair" is a song by the American hard rock band The Lucid. Included on their debut self-titled album The Lucid (2021), it was written by Drew Fortier, Mike Heller, David Ellefson and Vinnie Dombroski.

Background 
The instrumental of the song was originally demoed by Drew Fortier in 2017. In early 2020, Fortier revisited the piece along with frequent collaborators Mike Heller and David Ellefson who recorded drums and bass for the demo respectively. Vocalist Vinnie Dombroski was brought in as a collaborator, completing the song, "Hair" as well as the line up for the band.

Recording 
Drums and bass for the song were recorded at Mike Heller's Heaven and Heller Studio in Los Angeles, California with guitars and vocals handled by Fortier and Dombroski at their respective home studios.The song was mixed and mastered by Lasse Lammert.

Release 
The song was released on October 6, 2021 as the band's third single from The Lucid.

Music video 
The band collaborated with actor/filmmaker Hannah Fierman who, in addition to directing, wrote and starred in the video for "Hair". The video was released April 19 2021.

Accolades

References 

2021 songs
American alternative rock songs
American hard rock songs